Hurricane Creek may refer to:

 Hurricane Creek (Alabaha River), a tributary of the Alabaha River in Georgia
 Hurricane Creek (Arkansas), a stream on the list of National Wild and Scenic Rivers
 Hurricane Creek (Black Warrior River), a tributary of the Black Warrior River, Tuscaloosa County, Alabama
 Hurricane Creek (Paint Rock River), a tributary of the Paint Rock River, arising in Tennessee and flowing into Alabama 
 Hurricane Creek (Current River), a stream in Missouri
 Hurricane Creek (Missouri River), a stream in Missouri
 Hurricane Creek (Tenmile Creek), a stream in Missouri
 Hurricane Creek (Brown Creek tributary), a stream in Anson County, North Carolina
 Hurricane Creek, Cass County, Texas, a stream in Cass County, Texas 
 Hurricane Creek, Wise County, Virginia, a stream in Wise County, Virginia 
 Hurricane Creek Wilderness in Arkansas, on the list of U.S. Wilderness Areas

See also
 Hurricane Creek mine disaster, 1970 mining accident in Hyden, Kentucky
 List of rivers of Alabama
 List of rivers of West Virginia